Luděk Navara (born 1964) is a Czech non-fictional author, publicist, scenarist and historian. He graduated at Faculty of Civil Engineering of Brno University of Technology and later in history at Faculty of Philosophy of Masaryk University. Since 1995, he has been editor by newspaper MF Dnes. He cooperates also with Česká televize in Brno. His predominant coverage of history and journalism are crimes of Communism and Nazism, and flight and expulsion of Germans during and after WWII. In 2009, together with Miroslav Kasáček, he founded the Civic Association Memory, which maps communist totalitarianism in the Czech Republic, especially in the region of South Moravia. The civic association Paměť initiated the establishment of the Freedom Trail and the Iron Curtain Gate to Freedom Memorial near Mikulov.

Bibliography

Books 
 Smrt si říká Tutter
 Příběhy železné opony
 Příběhy železné opony 2

TV documents 
 A průvod Němců šel
 Odsunutý odsun
 Útěky železnou oponou

Czech poets
Czech male poets
Czech journalists
1964 births
Living people
Masaryk University alumni
Brno University of Technology alumni